Italian lira coins were the coins of the Italian lira that served as Italy's currency from 1861 until 2001 when it was replaced by the Euro. From 1980 until 2001, Lira 1 and Lire 2 coins were struck solely for collectors due to their low value, and in 1998 the Lire 5 was also sold for collectors only. Lire 10 and Lire 20 coins dated 2000 or 2001 were struck in sets only. The Lire 500 coin was the first bimetallic circulating coin, and was also the first circulating coin to feature Braille numerals (a Braille "500" is on the reverse side on top of the building).

Chart

References

lira
Italy